Tech4 Carmen Contreras-Bozak, (December 31, 1919 – January 30, 2017) was the first Puerto Rican woman to serve in the U.S. Women's Army Corps (WAC) where she served as an interpreter and in numerous administrative positions.

Early years
Contreras (birth name: Carmen Contreras Torres was the oldest of three siblings born and raised in the town of Cayey, Puerto Rico, located in the central mountains of the island. In Cayey, she received her primary education.

Her parents divorced and her mother, Lila Baudilia Lugo Torres, moved the family to New York City. In New York, Contreras attended Julia Richman High School and after she  graduated, she went to work for the National Youth Administration. Contreras worked for the War Department in Washington, D.C. as a payroll clerk after taking and passing a Civil Service test.

World War II
The Women's Army Auxiliary Corps (WAAC) was established during World War II on May 15, 1942, "for the purpose of making available to the national defense the knowledge, skill, and special training of the women of the nation." During this period, the Army was looking for bilingual Hispanic women to fill assignments in fields such as cryptology, communications and interpretation. In 1942, Contreras joined the Women's Army Auxiliary Corps (WAAC) and was sent to Fort Lee, Virginia, for training. Contreras volunteered to be part of the 149th WAAC Post Headquarters Company the first to go overseas, setting sail from New York Harbor for Europe in January 1943. She was the first person of Hispanic heritage and the first of approximately 200 Puerto Rican women who would serve in the Women's Army Corps during World War II.

The unit arrived in Northern Africa on January 27, 1943, and rendered overseas duties in Algiers, in General Dwight D. Eisenhower’s theatre headquarters.  The women who served abroad were not treated like the regular Army servicemen. They did not receive overseas payment nor could they receive government life insurance. These women had no protection if they became ill, wounded or captured.  If captured, the women were considered as "auxiliaries" serving with the Army rather than in it, and did not have the same protections under international law as the male soldiers. These were factors which the Army took into consideration when they decided to integrate the Women's Corps into the regular Army. On July 3, 1943, the WAC bill, which established the Women's Army Corps as integral part of the Army of the United States, was signed into law (Public Law 78-110) becoming effective on September 1, 1943.

Contreras was promoted to the rank of Tech 4 (Technical Sergeant) which, in today's Army, would equal the rank of Sergeant (E-4). Her  responsibilities included the transmission of encoded messages between Eisenhower's headquarters in Algiers and the battlefield in Tunisia. After returning home, Contreras entered Valley Forge General Hospital in July 1945, for treatment of an eye infection which she had contracted in Algiers. There she met Theodore John Bozak, a recovering combat wounded patient, who would become her husband. Carmen Contreras-Bozak and her husband  had three children, two sons, Brian and Robert, and a daughter, Carmen.

Later years
Contreras-Bozak lived for many years in Fort Lauderdale, Florida. There  she worked at the post office, and as a real estate broker. She started a chapter of WAC Veterans and in 1998 founded a chapter of the Society of Military Widows. She moved to Tampa where she resided until her death in January 2017 at the age of 97. Contreras-Bozak was buried in the Arlington National Cemetery, next to her husband Theodore John Bozak, in Washington, D.C.

Awards and decorations
Among Tech4 Carmen Contreras-Bozak's military decorations were the following:

See also

Carmen Lozano Dumler
Carmen García Rosado
List of Puerto Ricans
List of Puerto Rican military personnel
Puerto Rican women in the military
Puerto Ricans in World War II
History of women in Puerto Rico

Notes

References

Further reading
LAS WACS-Participacion de la Mujer Boricua en la Segunda Guerra Mundial; by: Carmen García Rosado; 1ra. Edicion publicada en Octubre de 2006; 2da Edicion revisada 2007; Regitro Propiedad Intectual ELA (Government of Puerto Rico) #06-13P-1A-399; Library of Congress TXY 1-312-685
Historia militar de Puerto Rico; by Héctor Andrés Negroni; pub. Sociedad Estatal Quinto Centenario (1992); 
Puertorriquenos Who Served With Guts, Glory, and Honor. Fighting to Defend a Nation Not Completely Their Own; by : Greg Boudonck;

External links

 Co-Sponsor H.R. 2134.

1919 births
2017 deaths
Burials at Arlington National Cemetery
Businesspeople from Florida
People from Fort Lauderdale, Florida
People from Cayey, Puerto Rico
Puerto Rican Army personnel
Puerto Rican women in the military
United States Army non-commissioned officers
Women's Army Corps soldiers
20th-century American businesspeople
Julia Richman Education Complex alumni